Buffered oxide etch (BOE), also known as buffered HF or BHF, is a wet etchant used in microfabrication.  Its primary use is in etching thin films of silicon dioxide (SiO2) or silicon nitride (Si3N4).   It is a mixture of a buffering agent, such as ammonium fluoride (NH4F), and hydrofluoric acid (HF).  Concentrated HF (typically 49% HF in water) etches silicon dioxide too quickly for good process control and also peels photoresist used in lithographic patterning. Buffered oxide etch is commonly used for more controllable etching.

Some oxides produce insoluble products in HF solutions. Thus, HCl is often added to BHF solutions in order to dissolve these insoluble products and produce a higher quality etch.  

A common buffered oxide etch solution comprises a 6:1 volume ratio of 40% NH4F in water to 49% HF in water.  This solution will etch  thermally grown oxide at approximately 2 nanometres per second at 25 degrees Celsius. Temperature can be increased to raise the etching rate. Continuous stirring of the solution during the etching process helps to have a more homogeneous solution, which may etch more uniformly by removing etched material from the surface.

References 

Etching (microfabrication)